Binzhou, formerly known as Bin County or Binxian, is a county-level city of Xianyang, Shaanxi, China, bordering Gansu province in two disparate sections to the north and west.

History

When Binzhou was first established during the Qin Dynasty, it was called Qi County. Later, the name was changed to Xinping Jun.During the Tang dynasty, The emperor Xuanzong changed its name to Binzhou.While in 1913 it was changed to Bin County. In 1964, the name was changed once more, closer to its current form. In May 2018, with the approval of the State Council, the then-Bin County was upgraded to the present county-level city status and renamed Binzhou.

In its current form, Bin County is named for Bin, the former home where Buzhu settled the Ji clan which became the Zhou dynasty.

Administrative Subdivisions
Binzhou holds jurisdiction over thirteen towns .
Towns

- Towns are upgraded from Townships.

- Towns are established newly.

- Former Towns are merged to other.
 Xiaozhang, Yongle            
- Former Townships are merged to other.
 Xipo  Township, Hanjia  Township, Chejiazhuang  Township, Taiyu  Township, Xinbaozi  Township

Climate

Notable residents
Zhang Zengdao — government official from the late Qing period

Transport
China National Highway 312
Xi'an–Pingliang railway
G70 Fuzhou–Yinchuan Expressway
Yinchuan–Xi'an high-speed railway

See also
Bin (city)

References

County-level divisions of Shaanxi
Xianyang